Michael McBride may refer to:

 Michael McBride (doctor), Chief Medical Officer of Northern Ireland
 Michael McBride (fighter) (born 1983), American fighter
 Michael McBride (Gaelic footballer) (born 1982), Irish Gaelic footballer
 Michael McBride (soccer coach) (born 1975), Australian youth football coach 
 Michael McBride, drummer for The Raspberries

See also 
 Michael McBryde (born 1981), Australian rower